The Koppin was a cyclecar built in Fenton, Michigan, by the Koppin Motor Company in 1914.

History 
The Koppin was a two-seater cyclecar that used a two-cylinder air-cooled Spacke DeLuxe engine of 1.2L capacity.  It came equipped with a friction transmission.  The vehicle was priced at $385, .  The Koppin Motor Company was the successor to the Fenton Cyclecar Company, the car also called the Signet in early advertising.

Oscar J. Howick, who had earlier worked for Lozier and Packard, was the designer of the Fenton. The company was organized by auto salesman George Jenks.  When Jenks died on March 23, 1914, the company was reorganized by H.S. Koppin, who also owned the empty A.J. Phillips factory that production was moved to. The vehicle was renamed the Koppin Model A roadster. The Koppin factory was destroyed by fire in September 1914.   Koppin carried on until the end of 1914 when the company was dissolved and he moved to Detroit.

References

Defunct motor vehicle manufacturers of the United States
Motor vehicle manufacturers based in Michigan
Defunct companies based in Michigan
Companies based in Genesee County, Michigan
Vehicle manufacturing companies established in 1914
Vehicle manufacturing companies disestablished in 1914
Cars introduced in 1914
Cyclecars
Brass Era vehicles
1910s cars